Newington is a town in Screven County, Georgia, United States. The population was 322 at the 2000 census.

Geography

Georgia State Routes 21 and 24 are the main routes through the town. GA-21 runs northwest-southeast as a four-lane divided highway to the west of downtown, leading northwest 14 mi (23 km) to Sylvania, the Screven County seat, and southeast 20 mi (32 km) to Springfield. GA-24 runs north-south through the downtown area as Oliver Highway, leading north 28 mi (45 km) to Hiltonia and southwest 23 mi (37 km) to Statesboro. 

Demographics

As of the census of 2000, there were 322 people, 137 households, and 89 families residing in the town. The racial makeup of the town was 69.88% White, 25.78% African American, 1.24% from other races, and 3.11% from two or more races. Hispanic or Latino people of any race were 3.11% of the population.

There were 137 households, out of which 26.3% had children under the age of 18 living with them, 46.7% were married couples living together, 15.3% had a female householder with no husband present, and 35.0% were non-families. 32.1% of all households were made up of individuals, and 11.7% had someone living alone who was 65 years of age or older.  The average household size was 2.35 and the average family size was 2.98.

The population was spread out, with 23.9% under the age of 18, 10.6% from 18 to 24, 23.6% from 25 to 44, 23.0% from 45 to 64, and 18.9% who were 65 years of age or older.  The median age was 39 years. For every 100 females, there were 89.4 males.  For every 100 females age 18 and over, there were 81.5 males.

The median income for a household in the town was $22,750, and the median income for a family was $23,125. Males had a median income of $27,917 versus $19,000 for females. Per capita income for the town was $11,326.  About 25.2% of families and 33.3% of the population were below the poverty line, including 56.3% of those under age 18 and 10.7% of those age 65 or over.

References

Towns in Screven County, Georgia
Towns in Georgia (U.S. state)